Leslie Ludy (born December 16, 1975) is an American Christian author, speaker, and editor.  She and her husband Eric Ludy wrote When God Writes Your Love Story. She has been a speaker at hundreds of conferences, colleges, and events, as well as a guest on many well-known media venues. She is a director of Set Apart Girl (setapartgirl), an online Christian magazine for young women.

Biograph
Leslie married her husband, Eric Ludy, in December 1994 in Denver, Colorado. Their story garnered much attention from the Christian community and was detailed in their popular books When Dreams Come True and When God Writes Your Love Story, the latter of which is one of the top-selling Christian relationship books ever written. Leslie Ludy's first book was published when she was 19 years old. From that point forward Ludy began traveling the world, speaking to various Christians on the principles of the Christian life.

Over a three-year period from 2005 to 2008, Ludy and Eric wrote 11 books. It was in this prolific season that she fine-tuned her articulation of what she terms "set-apart femininity". She serves as the executive director of Set Apart Girl, an organization that provides books, resources, conferences, and training for young Christian women. Her book, Set-Apart Femininity, published by Harvest House, garnered much acclaim and was a finalist for the Retailer’s Choice Award in 2009, in the Women’s Non-Fiction category. Paula Friedrichsen of the Christian Broadcasting Network said in a review of Set-Apart Femininity, "Leslie Ludy is a fresh voice in an age of compromise, and a passionate leader of young women everywhere. This book will appeal to those who believe that the lines have become blurred between the church and the world — and would be perfect for a discussion group or book club."

In 2009, the Ludys launched Ellerslie Leadership Training, a collegiate-level discipleship training program designed for Christian men and women who seek to live out the Christian life in a world-impacting way. Eric and Leslie live in Windsor, Colorado with their six children.

Bibliography
 His Perfect Faithfulness (1996; with Eric Ludy). Harvest Books. .
 Romance God’s Way (1997; with Eric Ludy). Makarios Publishing. .
 When God Writes Your Love Story (1998; with Eric Ludy). Multnomah Publishers. .
 When Dreams Come True (2000; with Eric Ludy). Multnomah Publishers. .
 Authentic Beauty (2003) Multnomah Publishers.  .
 When God Writes Your Life Story (2004; with; Eric Ludy). Multnomah Publishers. .
 Teaching True Love to a Sex-at-13 Generation (2005; with Eric Ludy). Thomas Nelson Publishers. .
 A Perfect Wedding (2006; with Eric Ludy). Harvest House Publishers. .
 The First 90 Days of Marriage (2006; with Eric Ludy). Thomas Nelson Publishers. .
 Authentic Beauty, Going Deeper: A Study Guide for the Set-Apart Young Woman (2007) Multnomah Publishers. .
 Meet Mr. Smith (2007; with Eric Ludy). Thomas Nelson Publishers. .
 Set-Apart Femininity (2008) Harvest House Publishers. 
 Sacred Singleness (2009) Harvest House Publishers. 
 Answering the Guy Questions (2009) Harvest House Publishers. 
 Wrestling Prayer (2009; with Eric Ludy). Harvest House Publishers. .
 The Lost Art of True Beauty (2010) Harvest House Publishers. .
 Set-Apart Motherhood (2014)
 The Set-Apart Woman (2015)

References

External links
 The Set-Apart Girl website
 Leslie and Eric Ludy at Ellerslie Mission Society

1975 births
Living people
American Christian writers
American magazine editors
People from Nacogdoches, Texas
20th-century American non-fiction writers
21st-century American non-fiction writers
20th-century American women writers
21st-century American women writers
Writers from Texas
Journalists from Texas
Women magazine editors